Sichuan University Jiang'an Campus Station is a metro station at Chengdu, Sichuan, China. It was opened on December 18, 2020 with the opening of Chengdu Metro Line 8. The station serves the nearby Jiang'an Campus of Sichuan University.

References

Chengdu Metro stations
Railway stations in China opened in 2020